The Rainmaker is a 1926 American silent drama film directed by Clarence G. Badger and written by Gerald Beaumont, Louis D. Lighton, and Hope Loring. The film stars William Collier, Jr., Georgia Hale, Ernest Torrence, Brandon Hurst, Joseph J. Dowling, and Tom Wilson. The film was released on May 10, 1926, by Paramount Pictures.

Cast

Preservation
With no prints of The Rainmaker located in any film archives, it is a lost film.

References

External links

1926 films
1920s English-language films
Silent American drama films
1926 drama films
Paramount Pictures films
Films directed by Clarence G. Badger
American black-and-white films
Lost American films
American silent feature films
1926 lost films
Lost drama films
1920s American films